Adelaide Fire is an Australian field hockey club based in Adelaide, South Australia. The club was established in 2019, and is one of 7 established to compete in Hockey Australia's new premier domestic competition, Hockey One.

The club unifies both men and women under one name, unlike South Australia's former representation in the Australian Hockey League as the SA Hotshots (men) and SA Suns (women).

Adelaide Fire will compete for the first time in the inaugural season of Hockey One, which will be contested from late September through to mid November 2019.

History
Adelaide Fire, along with six other teams, was founded on 17 April 2019 as part of Hockey Australia's development of hockey. The establishment of the club however, was not met without challenges. It was feared Hockey SA would not enter Hockey One due to financial restraints, however after a public fundraiser the entry quota was met.

The club name of the Fire is a natural progression and combination of the former club names – the Hotshots and the Suns.

Uniform
The club colours are a modern take on traditional SA colours, the yellow, now replaced with white provides a cleaner, modern feel to the uniforms.

Home Stadium 
Adelaide Fire are based out of the State Hockey Centre in South Australia's capital city, Adelaide. The stadium has a capacity of 4,000 spectators, with 330 fixed seats.

Throughout the Hockey One league, Adelaide Fire will play a number of home games at the stadium.

Teams

Men's team
The following players represented the men's team during the 2019 edition of the Sultana Bran Hockey One League.

Women's team
The following players represented the women's team during the 2019 edition of the Sultana Bran Hockey One League.

Linzi Appleyard
Brooklyn Buchecker
Jane Claxton 
Emma de Broughe
Holly Evans
Rachel McCann
Emily Grist
Sarah Harrison
Amy Hunt
Euleena MacLachlan
Karri McMahon
Gabrielle Nance
Hattie Shand
Michaela Spano
Leah Welstead
Gemma McCaw
Leah Butt
Kate Denning
Amy Hammond (GK)
Ashlee Wells (GK)

References

Australian field hockey clubs
Women's field hockey teams in Australia
Sporting clubs in Adelaide
Field hockey clubs established in 2019
2019 establishments in Australia
Hockey One